État 40-001 to 40-143 was a class of 0-8-0 Tank locomotives of the Chemins de Fer de l'État. They later served with the SNCF who renumbered them 3-040.TA.1 to 3-040.TA.143.

Design
The 40-000s were of simple expansion with two cylinders and possessed a Crampton firebox and Walschaerts valve gear. The connecting rod was attached to the third axle; white the boiler had the steam dome on the first ring, and a sandbox on the second ring. The water tanks on each side of the firebox possessed a sloping front and gave the driver additional vision and permitted him to see if workmen were on the track in front of the engine. There were variants in cabs and several open cabs, others, closed.

These were designed to replace the 030 0-6-0 shunting engines. The 0-6-0 engines possessed a traction force of 40 tons, while the 0-8-0 were designed to have a traction force of 60 tons. It was in 1913 that the research department of the Chemins de Fer de l'État began to study the question of a replacement.

Construction
The series of 143 engines were built between 1914 and 1922, with a break during World War I. The first 18 engines, numbered 40-001 to 40-018, were put into service in 1914. The war prevented the construction of the rest of the series, and the last two engines of the first batch, 40-019 and 40-020, were taken by the German Army and not returned until 1919 and 1922 respectively. Construction resumed in 1920 and the full series of 143 engines was put into service by 1922. Most were built by French engineering companies, but six were built in the État's former Ouest workshops at Sotteville, Rouen. Locomotives of the same design were built for French industry.

Service
The engines were assigned to the depots of Paris-Vaugirard, Montrouge, Batignoles, Sotteville (Rouen), Le Havre, Dieppe, Trappes, Chartres, Caen, Cherbourg, St-Brieuc, Brest, Nantes, Rennes and La Rochelle as well as industrial railways and harbours. When the SNCF was formed, the series was renumbered 3-040.TA.1 to 3-040.TA.143.

During World War II, 52 locomotives were taken to Germany, where many of them were given enclosed cabs; 25 of these locomotives never returned and were written off. During the 1950s and 60s, twelve locomotives were sold to industry.

Preservation
There are two examples of this class which have survived into preservation. They are:—
40-137 (ANF 143 of 1922), later SNCF 3-040.TA.137, was one of the locomotives taken to Germany. It is now at the Musée vivant du chemin de fer in Longueville, Seine-et-Marne, and designated a Monument historique.
40-141 (Sotteville 64 of 1922), later SNCF 3-040.TA.141.

References

.40-001
0-8-0T locomotives
Railway locomotives introduced in 1914
Schneider locomotives
Fives-Lille locomotives
Standard gauge locomotives of France
ANF locomotives
Shunting locomotives